Isaac Gyamfi (born 9 September 2000) is a Ghanaian footballer who plays as a central midfielder .

References

External links
 

2000 births
Living people
Ghanaian footballers
Ghana youth international footballers
Association football midfielders
Ghana Premier League players
Accra Great Olympics F.C. players
KF Tirana players
Kategoria Superiore players
Ghanaian expatriate footballers
Ghanaian expatriate sportspeople in Albania
Expatriate footballers in Albania
Footballers from Accra